Sebastián Ricardo Nayar (born 10 May 1988) is an Argentinian professional footballer who plays as a midfielder for Victoria Hotspurs.

Career
Born in Buenos Aires, Nayar began his career with local team Boca Juniors, making one appearance in the 2008 Clausura. Nayar then moved to Spanish team Recreativo Huelva at the end of the season, despite still being contracted to Boca. During his debut season with Recreativo, Nayar made 14 appearances in the league. Nayar later signed for Colombian team Deportivo Cali, moving on to Mexican team Atlante, before returning to Argentina in January 2011 with Aldosivi. In September 2012, he joined Orihuela. In January 2013, he left Orihuela and joined San Roque de Lepe. He joined Greek club Kerkyra for the 2013–14 season. On August 11, 2015, he signed with Greek Football League club AE Larissa. On 17 February 2016 Nayar was released from his contract, due to a disciplinary offence. Five days later, On 22 February 2016, there was an official announcement from the club's major shareholder Alexis Kougias, stating that the player will finally remain in the team's squad. On 14 July 2016, Nayar left the club by mutual agreement. In September 2016, Nayar signed for Panegialios.

On 16 January 2020, Nayar signed with Victoria Hotspurs.

References

External links
 
 
 

1988 births
Living people
Footballers from Buenos Aires
Argentine footballers
Boca Juniors footballers
Recreativo de Huelva players
Deportivo Cali footballers
Atlante F.C. footballers
Aldosivi footballers
Orihuela CF players
CD San Roque de Lepe footballers
PAE Kerkyra players
Panegialios F.C. players
Floriana F.C. players
Lincoln Red Imps F.C. players
Ħamrun Spartans F.C. players
Victoria Hotspurs F.C. players
Argentine Primera División players
Categoría Primera A players
La Liga players
Maltese Premier League players
Football League (Greece) players
Argentine expatriate footballers
Argentine expatriate sportspeople in Spain
Argentine expatriate sportspeople in Colombia
Argentine expatriate sportspeople in Mexico
Argentine expatriate sportspeople in Greece
Argentine expatriate sportspeople in Gibraltar
Argentine expatriate sportspeople in Malta
Expatriate footballers in Colombia
Expatriate footballers in Mexico
Expatriate footballers in Spain
Expatriate footballers in Greece
Expatriate footballers in Gibraltar
Expatriate footballers in Malta
Association football midfielders